Ali Yasak (born 1956), better known as Drej Ali (literally: Ali, the tall), is one of Turkey's most renowned criminals. He was involved in the Susurluk scandal.

On December 19, 1977, he was elected a board member of the Urfa Branch of the Idealists’ Union (ÜOD) (Grey Wolves). In 1978, he became chairman of the students association of Urfa Education Institute.

On January 12, 1978, he was arrested for participating in an illegal demonstration, and was released on court's order on January 25, 1978, to be prosecuted without arrest. On January 26, 1978, he was wounded in an armed clash with opposing groups.

Since 1990, due to his ties with the organized crime, he was involved in the activity of collecting money for checks and vouchers in İstanbul. Besides, he had correspondence with fugitives and wanted ultra-nationalist activists abroad.

On 5 August 2013 Yasak was sentenced to six years and three months as part of the Ergenekon trials.

References

Sources 
  (contains the Susurluk reports in English)

1956 births
Grey Wolves (organization) members
People from Şanlıurfa
Living people
People convicted in the Ergenekon trials
Inmates of Silivri Prison

Turkish crime bosses